Leptogyra bujnitzkii is a species of sea snail, a marine gastropod mollusk in the family Melanodrymiidae.

Description

Distribution
This species is only known from the slope of Lomonosov Ridge, 81°50’N, 136°14’E, 3,700–3,800 m, Arctic Ocean.

References

 Gofas, S.; Le Renard, J.; Bouchet, P. (2001). Mollusca, in: Costello, M.J. et al. (Ed.) (2001). European register of marine species: a check-list of the marine species in Europe and a bibliography of guides to their identification. Collection Patrimoines Naturels, 50: pp. 180–213
 Kantor Yu.I. & Sysoev A.V. (2006) Marine and brackish water Gastropoda of Russia and adjacent countries: an illustrated catalogue. Moscow: KMK Scientific Press. 372 pp. + 140 pls. page(s): 40
 Gorbunov G. P. (1946). Novi i interesni vidi mollusca i brachiopoda iz severnogo ledovitogo okeana. [New and interesting species of Mollusca and Brachiopoda from the Arctic Ocean]. Trudy Drejfuyushchey Ekspeditsii Glavsevomorputi na ledokol'nom. parakhode. G. Sedov 1937-1940 [Proceedings of the drifting expedition on the icebreaker steamer "G. Sedov" in 1937-1949] 3: 308-322 pl. 1-4

External links
 Krol, E. N.; Nekhaev, I. O. (2020). Redescription of Leptogyra bujnitzkii (Gorbunov, 1946) comb. nov., the first representative of the gastropod subclass Neomphaliones from the high Arctic. Zootaxa. 4759(3): 446-450

Gastropods described in 1946